Sylvanie Morandais (born 14 July 1979) is a retired French athlete who specialized in the 400 metres hurdles.

She was born in Pointe-Noire, Guadeloupe. She won the gold medal at the 2005 Jeux de la Francophonie, and the 2005 Mediterranean Games. She also competed without reaching the final at the 2001 World Championships and the 2002 European Championships. In the 4 x 400 metres relay she finished fifth at the 2002 European Championships.

Her personal best times are 55.30 seconds in the 400 metres, achieved in May 2006 in Baie-Mahault; and 55.49 seconds in the 400 metres hurdles, achieved in July 2001 in Monaco.

International competitions

National titles
French Athletics Championships
400 m hurdles: 2001, 2002, 2003, 2004, 2005

References

External links
 

1979 births
Living people
People from Pointe-Noire, Guadeloupe
French female hurdlers
Guadeloupean female hurdlers
French people of Guadeloupean descent
World Athletics Championships athletes for France
Universiade medalists in athletics (track and field)
Mediterranean Games gold medalists for France
Mediterranean Games medalists in athletics
Athletes (track and field) at the 2001 Mediterranean Games
Universiade bronze medalists for France
Medalists at the 2001 Summer Universiade